Joshua Lawrence Barnett (born November 10, 1977) is an American mixed martial artist, submission grappler, professional wrestler and color commentator currently signed to Bellator MMA. Barnett previously competed for the Ultimate Fighting Championship (UFC), where he was the youngest ever UFC Heavyweight Champion. In 2003, Barnett was the final Openweight King Of Pancrase and was a finalist in both the 2006 PRIDE Openweight Grand Prix and the 2012 Strikeforce Heavyweight Championship Grand Prix. He has also competed in Affliction, World Victory Road, DREAM and Impact FC. In Brazilian jiu-jitsu, Barnett was the World No-Gi Brazilian Jiu-Jitsu Champion in 2009 and won the inaugural Metamoris Heavyweight Championship in 2014.

As a professional wrestler, Barnett made his in-ring debut in 2003 in the main event of New Japan Pro-Wrestling's annual January 4 Tokyo Dome Show, in a bout against IWGP Heavyweight Champion Yuji Nagata. Since then he has also wrestled for Inoki Genome Federation and Total Nonstop Action Wrestling. In January 2015, Barnett began working as a color commentator for NJPW's weekly program on America's AXS TV.

Early life
Born and raised in Seattle, Washington, Barnett had a troubled childhood and often got into fights. He was put into anger management programs at a young age and learned to cope with his anger by participating in athletics. Barnett attended Ballard High School, where he excelled at wrestling, football, and also trained in judo and Muay Thai. After seeing UFC 2 as a sophomore, he decided that he wanted to be a mixed martial artist. Barnett had originally attended the University of Montana to play football for the school as a walk-on, but decided not to play the sport for the university. At the recommendation of an instructor at Montana, Barnett went to train at the Bushidokan dojo of Jim Harrison. Although he did not have the money for classes, he received training in exchange for helping with maintenance and labor at the dojo.

Mixed martial arts career

Early career
Barnett's documented professional debut was in early 1997 in Washington, competing for United Full Contact Federation. He won via rear-naked choke submission under three minutes into the fight. He would continue to dominate, reaching a 9–0 record with seven first-round stoppages and wins over future UFC Hall of Famer Dan Severn, Bobby Hoffman, John Marsh, and Bob Gilstrap twice. With a 9–0 record, Barnett was invited to compete in the UFC.

Ultimate Fighting Championship
Barnett made his UFC debut at UFC 28 on November 17, 2000 against 6' 10" Gan "The Giant" McGee and Barnett won via TKO in the second round. Despite suffering a KO loss in his next fight against Pedro Rizzo at UFC 30 he would bounce back and win his next two fights over 7' 0" Dutch kickboxer Semmy Schilt via armbar submission at UFC 32, and then received a submission win in a rematch with Bobby Hoffman at UFC 34. Subsequent to his win over Hoffman, Barnett tested positive for banned substances and was given a warning by the Nevada State Athletic Commission.  Barnett was then given a title shot for the UFC Heavyweight Championship against then-champion and future UFC Hall of Famer Randy Couture at UFC 36. He won via TKO after using the ground and pound technique and became the new and youngest-ever UFC Heavyweight Champion. However, after the bout it was revealed that he had again tested positive for banned substances and his title was stripped.

Pancrase and PRIDE
Barnett competed in MMA in both PRIDE and Pancrase in Japan. While in Pancrase, he became the Openweight King of Pancrase by defeating Yuki Kondo. Winning this title put him alongside the likes of Ken Shamrock, Frank Shamrock and Bas Rutten as one of the few fighters to be a titleholder in both Pancrase and the UFC.

In his first fight in PRIDE, at PRIDE 28 against Croatian Mirko Cro Cop, he suffered a simultaneous fracture and dislocated shoulder injury that required surgery and over six months of rehab. His first fight back post-injury was a rematch against Cro Cop at PRIDE 30, which he lost by a unanimous decision. He came back with a win against Kazuhiro Nakamura at PRIDE 31. Josh Barnett was scheduled to fight Pride World Heavyweight Champion Fedor Emelianenko for the title but withdrew from the fight due to an appendicitis. Barnett underwent surgery to remove his appendix later that night.   

Barnett later beat Alexander Emelianenko by an americana submission in the second round of the PRIDE Openweight Grand Prix at PRIDE Total Elimination Absolute. He submitted Mark Hunt via kimura in the first round of the Openweight Grand Prix at Pride Critical Countdown Absolute. Barnett defeated Antônio Rodrigo Nogueira by split decision in the semi finals of the Openweight Grand Prix, however he lost the final match of the PRIDE Final Conflict Absolute to Cro Cop on September 10, 2006, submitting after an unintentional finger poke to the eye. In a post-fight interview, Barnett explained the incident: "I opened up my guard and I grabbed his leg to go for a leg lock, and in the scramble Mirko put his hand out to post and he caught a finger deep in my right eye. And as soon as it happened I let go of the leg and grabbed my face, and I couldn't see anything at the time and I had no idea where he was and I just didn't want him to punt me in the face with a kick when I can't see and I'm blinded. He said, you know, 'Sorry' and I said to him that he was winning that night and it was an accident. He didn't mean [to do it]". This also marked the third time he was beaten by the MMA legend.

Next, Barnett fought the Polish Judo gold medalist Pawel Nastula at PRIDE 32, the organization's first show in the United States. To fight again in Nevada, the Nevada State Athletic Commission required that Barnett pass a mandatory drug test. In a surprisingly competitive match, Nastula controlled the first round and most of the second. Barnett reversed Nastula from the bottom and was able to secure a toe-hold submission, which earned him the victory. At a post-fight press conference, Barnett complimented Nastula on his performance. Nastula, however, subsequently tested positive for steroids.  Barnett then lost a rematch by unanimous decision to Antônio Rodrigo Nogueira at Pride Shockwave 2006.

World Victory Road: Sengoku
After the bout against Nogueira and the acquisition of PRIDE by the UFC, Barnett did not participate in any MMA events in 2007. Barnett did not follow many other PRIDE veterans to the UFC because he desired to join an organization that included the top Heavyweight fighter in the world, Fedor Emelianenko.  In 2008, Barnett joined the newly organized MMA promotion, Sengoku, and fought in consecutive main events at Sengoku 1 and Sengoku 2, submitting Hidehiko Yoshida with a heel hook in the third round, and defeating Jeff Monson by unanimous decision.

Affliction Entertainment
Since his contract with World Victory Road was not exclusive, Barnett was able to join other MMA events. Barnett participated in the inaugural MMA event held by Affliction Entertainment, in July 2008. Seven years after his only knockout loss to Pedro Rizzo, he avenged that loss at Affliction: Banned with a knockout of his own in the second round.

In January 2009, Barnett fought PRIDE veteran Gilbert Yvel at Affliction: Day of Reckoning. Barnett defeated Yvel by a submission resulting from strikes in the third round. His next match-up, scheduled on August 1, 2009 against Fedor Emelianenko at Affliction's 3rd event Affliction: Trilogy, was one of the most anticipated match-up between the then ranked number one Heavyweight Emelianenko and number two Heavyweight Barnett. Dana White announced if Barnett were to defeat Emelianenko, he would sign him back into the UFC and would grant him a title shot against UFC Heavyweight Champion Brock Lesnar. However, the fight was officially pulled 10 days before the fight by the California State Athletic Commission after Barnett tested positive for anabolic steroids (a metabolite of drostanolone) for a third time. The event and Affliction Entertainment itself was cancelled July 24, 2009 as a result. Barnett requested that they test his "B" sample hoping there was an error in the test. His "B" sample was also positive.

Post-Affliction
Due to the positive drug tests, Barnett made a re-licensure appeal to the California State Athletic Commission (CSAC). The CSAC postponed Barnett's appeal three times. The first two postponements occurred because Barnett's law firm required additional information from the laboratory that conducted Barnett's tests. Michael J. DiMaggio, Barnett's attorney, was unable to attend the hearing because of travel problems, causing the third extension, which would have taken place February 22, 2010.

Barnett was a no-show at his hearing on February 22, 2010, making this the fourth delay in his appeal. Shannon Hooper, Barnett's manager, told MMAjunkie.com that on Monday February 22, 2010 Barnett was in Japan on Sunday February 21, 2010 for a professional wrestling match and would return to the U.S. later that day. He claimed he was unaware that his presence was required, but the CSAC stated they had notified him of this months before. Barnett later signed on with MMA organization Strikeforce.

DREAM
Barnett signed to fight for DREAM in 2010, and made his debut on March 22, 2010 at DREAM 13 against Mighty Mo. He won the fight via submission in the first round. During the fight, he accidentally kicked Mighty Mo in the groin so immediately after winning the fight, Barnett approached Mighty Mo apologizing for the illegal strike and in return allowed Mighty Mo to knee him in the groin.

Strikeforce
On September 13, 2010 it was announced that Josh Barnett had signed a multi-fight deal with Strikeforce.

Barnett faced Brett Rogers on June 18, 2011 at Strikeforce: Overeem vs. Werdum in the opening round of a Strikeforce Heavyweight Tournament. Barnett submitted Rogers with an arm triangle choke in the second round of the bout.

Barnett defeated Sergei Kharitonov in the semi-final of the tournament headlining Strikeforce: Barnett vs. Kharitonov on September 10, 2011 at U.S. Bank Arena in Cincinnati, Ohio.

He faced fellow finalist Daniel Cormier on May 19, 2012 at Strikeforce: Barnett vs. Cormier to determine the Strikeforce Heavyweight Grand Prix Champion. Dana White announced if Barnett were to defeat Cormier, he would be allowed back into the UFC, "If he wins the fight, I can't see why he wouldn't come [to the UFC]." Barnett lost the bout via unanimous decision (49–46, 50–45, and 50–45), losing for the first time in over 5 years.

In January 2013, Barnett faced a promotional newcomer, Nandor Guelmino, at Strikeforce: Marquardt vs. Saffiedine, the final Strikeforce event. Barnett defeated Guelmino via arm triangle choke submission in the first round.

Return to the UFC
Barnett initially declined to sign with the UFC. However, on May 21, 2013, it was announced that Barnett had returned to the UFC and signed a multi-fight contract with the promotion.

Barnett faced former UFC Heavyweight Champion Frank Mir on August 31, 2013 at UFC 164. He won the fight in the first round by technical knockout.

Barnett faced Travis Browne on December 28, 2013 at UFC 168. He lost the fight via knockout due to elbow strikes in the first round.

After working as a coach on Road to UFC Japan, Barnett faced Roy Nelson in the main event at UFC Fight Night 75. He won the fight via unanimous decision (48–47, 48–47, and 50–45).  The win also earned Barnett his first Performance of the Night bonus award.

Barnett faced Ben Rothwell on January 30, 2016 at UFC on Fox 18. He lost the fight in the second round due to a guillotine choke, resulting in the first loss due to a submission hold during Barnett's lengthy MMA career.

Barnett next faced Andrei Arlovski on September 3, 2016 at UFC Fight Night 93. He won the fight via rear naked choke submission in the third round, earning a Performance of the Night bonus. Both participants were awarded Fight of the Night for their performance.

In December 2016, UFC was notified of a potential USADA doping violation by Barnett from an out-of-competition test. In March 2018, Barnett was clear to fight and received a "public reprimand" instead of a suspension from USADA after it was determined that his failed test was the result of a contaminated supplement.

Departure from Ultimate Fighting Championship 
On June 20, 2018, Barnett was granted his request to be released from UFC, claiming he does not trust the United States Anti-Doping Agency.

Bellator MMA 
On April 1, 2019, it was revealed that Barnett signed a multi-fight contract with Bellator MMA. Barnett was expected to make his promotional debut against Ronny Markes on December 20, 2019 at Bellator's Salute the Troops event in Honolulu, Hawaii, but was deemed unable to compete due to severe illness on the night of the event. The bout was rescheduled for Bellator 241 on March 13, 2020, but Barnett failed medical tests and was replaced by Matt Mitrione.

KSW
Barnett competed against former KSW Heavyweight Champion Marcin Różalski in a bare-knuckle boxing match with elbows allowed on October 23, 2020, thanks to coming to an agreement with Bellator. The fight took place at the KSW event titled Genesis. Barnett defeated Różalski by TKO via doctor stoppage after the second round.

Professional wrestling

New Japan Pro-Wrestling (2003–2004, 2015–present)
Barnett began his overseas career as a professional wrestler in the New Japan Pro-Wrestling (NJPW) organization, where he wrestled numerous matches in 2003 and 2004. In his first match, he wrestled champion Yuji Nagata for that promotions version of the IWGP Heavyweight Championship. Although unsuccessful in that match, Barnett formed a tag team with Perry Saturn and was undefeated in the following NJPW tour, Fighting Spirit 2003. Barnett wrestled over 50 matches in total for the NJPW promotion.

In January 2015, Barnett began working as a color commentator for NJPW's weekly program on AXS TV.

In 2022, Josh Barnett began appearing on NJPW Strong occasionally wrestling.

Inoki Genome Federation (2007–2014)
Barnett debuted in Antonio Inoki's Inoki Genome Federation (IGF) wrestling promotion in June 2007 with a victory over Tadao Yasuda. He racked up victories against Don Frye and Montanha Silva before suffering his first loss against Naoya Ogawa. The same man he beat earlier in the night. Since the loss, he has been on a winning streak beating The Predator, Hitokui Yoshiki, Tank Abbott, Jon Andersen, Fonseca, Atsushi Sawada, Bob Sapp, Ultimate Mask, Tim Sylvia, Montanha Silva, Bobby Lashley and Hideki Suzuki.

Starting in February at IGF Genome 14, IGF began a title tournament to crown a new Heavyweight Champion and Barnett not only continued his winning streak but he advanced to the semi-finals of the tournament with his victory over Montanha Silva. In July at IGF Genome 16, he defeated Bobby Lashley with a cross armbreaker to advance to the finals of the title tournament. He was scheduled to face Jérôme Le Banner for the IGF Heavyweight Championship in a tournament final scheduled for August 27 at the IGF Super Stars Festival 2011. However, it was announced on August 19 that Barnett had to pull out of the match up and Le Banner was declared the first ever IGF champion on August 22. However, Josh Barnett would get his shot at the IGF Heavyweight Championship on December 2 against the champion, Jerome Le Banner. Barnett would lose the contest by knockout.

On New Year's Eve, Barnett made his return to Japan for the Fight for Japan event, where he would face Hideki Suzuki in an IGF Rules match. After a wrestling clinic was put on by both athletes, it was Barnett who won with a brainbuster to seal the victory.

Total Nonstop Action Wrestling (2017)
During the January 2017 Impact Wrestling tapings, Barnett joined Total Nonstop Action Wrestling (TNA), answering an open challenge from Bobby Lashley, for a match for the TNA World Heavyweight Championship.

Return to the IGF (2017)
Barnett returned to IGF on April 5, 2017, defeating Shinichi Suzukawa on the promotion's inaugural Next Exciting Wrestling (NEW) event.

Game Changer Wrestling (2019–present)
Josh Barnett hosted the GCW Bloodsport event of 2019. He fought Minoru Suzuki in the main event. On June 22, 2019 it was announced that Bloodsport 2 would happen on September 14, 2019 in Atlantic City, New Jersey. Jon Moxley was announced as his opponent. After Moxley had to bow out of the bout due to injury, Chris Dickinson would be announced as his replacement. Josh Barnett would go on to defeat Chris Dickinson in the main event.

On  January 13, 2020 Josh announced that on April 2, 2020 at Josh Barnett's: Bloodsport 3, he would finally face off against Jon Moxley.  Due to the COVID-19 pandemic, the event was rescheduled for October 11 in Marion County, Indiana and the main event announced for Bloodsport 3 was Jon Moxley vs. Chris Dickinson.

Submission grappling
Barnett competed in the California Classic 2009 BJJ Tournament on November 15, 2009. Barnett lost a decision to ADCC veteran and Brazilian jiu-jitsu World Champion Romulo Barral from Gracie Barra in the Black Belt Gi Absolute division. On December 19, 2009, Erik Paulson awarded Barnett his Brazilian jiu-jitsu black belt. Even though Barnett had never trained in Brazilian jiu-jitsu he was given his belt based on competition merit and overall knowledge.

In the co-main event of Metamoris 4, Barnett faced Dean Lister, a multiple-time world champion in both gi and no-gi Brazilian jiu-jitsu. Barnett became the first person in sixteen years to defeat Lister via submission, tapping Lister with a scarf hold in the waning seconds of the match.

Other endeavors

In 2017 Barnett formed his own fight team. They took their name from the shoot style that Billy Robinson helped popularize in Japan. The team is called UWF USA, it is a Shootfighting and Catch Wrestling based fighting team. Barnett is the head coach/trainer for the team.

Barnett appeared as himself in an episode of the 2013 web series Black Dynamite Teaches a Hard Way!, where a Black Dynamite mannequin teaches him the consequences of littering.

Fighting style
Barnett defines himself as a catch wrestler. His grappling technique is based on catch, utilizing the controls, rides and pinning holds from said discipline to exert pressure over his opponent and grind him down when the fight gets to the ground. In order to finish the match, he is skilled in the aspect of lockflow or chain wrestling, in which he gets from a position to another to get a submission hold. As well as his grappling expertise, Barnett also has a powerful Muay Thai game, which features the ability to switch stances during the fight, confusing his opponent and strengthening Barnett's assault. Barnett has also shown the ability to enhance his striking with catch wrestling, using collar ties and wrist grips to set up elbows and knees against the fence.

Personal life
In an interview on The Steve Austin Show, Barnett confirmed that he is not religious. In his spare time, he enjoys driving and repairing automobiles, preferring vintage models. He is a self-proclaimed cinephile and cites the final  cut of Blade Runner as his favorite motion picture.

He plays and is a fan of the card game Magic: The Gathering.

Barnett's nickname 'The Warmaster' was inspired by a song by the British death metal band Bolt Thrower, itself named after a character from the Sci-Fi-themed miniature wargame Warhammer 40,000. Barnett is a noted heavy metal fan, and has used Bolt Thrower as entrance music during his MMA career.

Championships and accomplishments

Mixed martial arts
Pancrase
Openweight King of Pancrase (One time, last champion)
Two Successful Title Defenses
PRIDE Fighting Championship
2006 PRIDE Heavyweight Grand Prix Runner-up
Strikeforce
2013 Strikeforce Heavyweight Grand Prix Runner-up
Icon Sport
SuperBrawl 13 Heavyweight Tournament Winner
Ultimate Fighting Championship
UFC Heavyweight Championship (One time)
 Youngest UFC Heavyweight Champion in History (24-years-old)
Fight of the Night (One time)
Performance of the Night (Two times)
Sherdog
Mixed Martial Arts Hall of Fame

Submission grappling
International Brazilian Jiu-Jitsu Federation
2009 World No Gi Jiu-Jitsu Championship Black Belt Gold Medalist

International Gracie Jiu-Jitsu Federation
Gracie US Nationals 2010 – 206+ lb / Advanced No-Gi: 1st place

Metamoris
Metamoris Heavyweight Champion (1 time)
One successful title defense vs. Ryron Gracie

Mixed martial arts record

|-
|Win
|align=center|35–8
|Andrei Arlovski
|Submission (rear-naked choke)
|UFC Fight Night: Arlovski vs. Barnett
|
|align=center|3
|align=center|2:53
|Hamburg, Germany
|
|-
|Loss
|align=center|34–8
|Ben Rothwell
|Submission (guillotine choke)
|UFC on Fox: Johnson vs. Bader
|
|align=center|2
|align=center|3:48
|Newark, New Jersey, United States
|
|-
|Win
| align=center|34–7
| Roy Nelson
| Decision (unanimous)
| UFC Fight Night: Barnett vs. Nelson
| 
| align=center|5
| align=center|5:00
| Saitama, Japan
| 
|-
| Loss
| align=center|33–7
| Travis Browne
| KO (elbows)
| UFC 168
| 
| align=center|1 
| align=center|1:00
| Las Vegas, Nevada, United States
|
|-
| Win
| align=center| 33–6
| Frank Mir
| TKO (knee)
| UFC 164
| 
| align=center| 1
| align=center| 1:56
| Milwaukee, Wisconsin, United States
| 
|-
| Win
| align=center| 32–6
| Nandor Guelmino
| Submission (arm-triangle choke)
| Strikeforce: Marquardt vs. Saffiedine
| 
| align=center| 1
| align=center| 2:11
| Oklahoma City, Oklahoma, United States
| 
|-
| Loss
| align=center| 31–6
| Daniel Cormier
| Decision (unanimous)
| Strikeforce: Barnett vs. Cormier
| 
| align=center| 5
| align=center| 5:00
| San Jose, California, United States
| 
|-
| Win
| align=center| 31–5
| Sergei Kharitonov
| Submission (arm-triangle choke)
| Strikeforce: Barnett vs. Kharitonov
| 
| align=center| 1
| align=center| 4:28
| Cincinnati, Ohio, United States
| 
|-
| Win
| align=center| 30–5
| Brett Rogers
| Submission (arm-triangle choke)
| Strikeforce: Overeem vs. Werdum
| 
| align=center| 2
| align=center| 1:58
| Dallas, Texas, United States
| 
|-
| Win
| align=center| 29–5
| Geronimo dos Santos
| TKO (punches)
| Impact FC 1
| 
| align=center| 1
| align=center| 2:35
| Brisbane, Australia
| 
|-
| Win
| align=center| 28–5
| Siala-Mou Siliga
| Submission (kimura)
| DREAM 13
| 
| align=center| 1
| align=center| 4:41
| Kanagawa, Japan
| 
|-
| Win
| align=center| 27–5
| Gilbert Yvel
| TKO (submission to punches) 
| Affliction: Day of Reckoning
| 
| align=center| 3
| align=center| 3:05
| Anaheim, California, United States
| 
|-
| Win
| align=center| 26–5
| Pedro Rizzo
| KO (punch)
| Affliction: Banned
| 
| align=center| 2
| align=center| 1:44
| Anaheim, California, United States
| 
|-
| Win
| align=center| 25–5
| Jeff Monson
| Decision (unanimous)
| World Victory Road Presents: Sengoku 2
| 
| align=center| 3
| align=center| 5:00
| Tokyo, Japan
| 
|-
| Win
| align=center| 24–5
| Hidehiko Yoshida
| Submission (heel hook)
| World Victory Road Presents: Sengoku First Battle
| 
| align=center| 3
| align=center| 3:23
| Tokyo, Japan
| 
|-
| Loss
| align=center| 23–5
| Antônio Rodrigo Nogueira
| Decision (unanimous)
| PRIDE FC: Shockwave 2006
| 
| align=center| 3
| align=center| 5:00
| Saitama, Japan
| 
|-
| Win
| align=center| 23–4
| Pawel Nastula
| Submission (toe hold)
| PRIDE 32: The Real Deal
| 
| align=center| 2
| align=center| 3:04
| Las Vegas, Nevada, United States
| 
|-
| Loss
| align=center| 22–4
| Mirko Cro Cop
| TKO (submission to punches)
| PRIDE FC: Final Conflict Absolute
| 
| align=center| 1
| align=center| 7:32
| Saitama, Japan
| 
|-
| Win
| align=center| 22–3
| Antônio Rodrigo Nogueira
| Decision (split)
| PRIDE FC: Final Conflict Absolute.
| 
| align=center| 2
| align=center| 5:00
| Saitama, Japan
| 
|-
| Win
| align=center| 21–3
| Mark Hunt
| Submission (kimura)
| PRIDE FC: Critical Countdown Absolute
| 
| align=center| 1
| align=center| 2:02
| Saitama, Japan
| 
|-
| Win
| align=center| 20–3
| Alexander Emelianenko
| Submission (keylock)
| PRIDE FC: Total Elimination Absolute
| 
| align=center| 2
| align=center| 1:57
| Osaka, Japan
| 
|-
| Win
| align=center| 19–3
| Kazuhiro Nakamura
| Submission (rear-naked choke)
| PRIDE 31: Dreamers
| 
| align=center| 1
| align=center| 8:10
| Saitama, Japan
| 
|-
| Loss
| align=center| 18–3
| Mirko Cro Cop
| Decision (unanimous)
| PRIDE 30
| 
| align=center| 3
| align=center| 5:00
| Saitama, Japan
| 
|-
| Loss
| align=center| 18–2
| Mirko Cro Cop
| TKO (shoulder injury)
| PRIDE 28
| 
| align=center| 1
| align=center| 0:46
| Saitama, Japan
| 
|-
| Win
| align=center| 18–1
| Rene Rooze
| TKO (punches)
| K-1 MMA: Romanex
| 
| align=center| 1
| align=center| 2:15
| Saitama, Japan
| 
|-
| Win
| align=center| 17–1
| Semmy Schilt
| Submission (armbar)
| Inoki Bom-Ba-Ye 2003
| 
| align=center| 3
| align=center| 4:48
| Hyogo, Japan
| 
|-
| Win
| align=center| 16–1
| Yoshiki Takahashi
| Submission (triangle armbar)
| NJPW Ultimate Crush II
| 
| align=center| 2
| align=center| 2:52
| Tokyo, Japan
|  
|-
| Win
| align=center| 15–1
| Yuki Kondo
| Submission (rear-naked choke)
| Pancrase: 10th Anniversary Show
| 
| align=center| 3
| align=center| 3:26
| Tokyo, Japan
| 
|-
| Win
| align=center| 14–1
| Jimmy Ambriz
| TKO (knee and punches)
| NJPW Ultimate Crush
| 
| align=center| 1
| align=center| 3:05
| Tokyo, Japan
| 
|-
| Win
| align=center| 13–1
| Randy Couture
| TKO (punches)
| UFC 36
| 
| align=center| 2
| align=center| 4:35
| Las Vegas, Nevada, United States
| 
|-
| Win
| align=center| 12–1
| Bobby Hoffman
| TKO (submission to punches)
| UFC 34
| 
| align=center| 2
| align=center| 4:25
| Las Vegas, Nevada, United States
| 
|-
| Win
| align=center| 11–1
| Semmy Schilt
| Submission (armbar)
| UFC 32
| 
| align=center| 1
| align=center| 4:21
| East Rutherford, New Jersey, United States
| 
|-
| Loss
| align=center| 10–1
| Pedro Rizzo
| KO (punch)
| UFC 30
| 
| align=center| 2
| align=center| 4:21
| Atlantic City, New Jersey, United States
| 
|-
| Win
| align=center| 10–0
| Gan McGee
| TKO (punches)
| UFC 28
| 
| align=center| 2
| align=center| 4:34
| Atlantic City, New Jersey, United States
| 
|-
| Win
| align=center| 9–0
| Dan Severn
| Submission (armbar)
| SuperBrawl 16
| 
| align=center| 4
| align=center| 1:21
| Honolulu, Hawaii, United States
| 
|-
| Win
| align=center| 8–0
| Bobby Hoffman
| Decision (unanimous)
| SuperBrawl 13
| 
| align=center| 3
| align=center| 5:00
| Honolulu, Hawaii, United States
|  
|-
| Win
| align=center| 7–0
| John Marsh
| Submission (kimura)
| SuperBrawl 13
| 
| align=center| 1
| align=center| 4:23
| Honolulu, Hawaii, United States
|  
|-
| Win
| align=center| 6–0
| Juha Tuhkasaari
| Submission (armbar)
| SuperBrawl 13
| 
| align=center| 1
| align=center| 3:32
| Honolulu, Hawaii, United States
|  
|-
| Win
| align=center| 5–0
| Trevor Howard
| Submission (armbar)
| UFCF 4
| 
| align=center| 1
| align=center| N/A
| Washington, United States
| 
|-
| Win
| align=center| 4–0
| Bob Gilstrap
| DQ  
| UFCF 3
| 
| align=center| 1
| align=center| 0:42
| Lynnwood, Washington, United States
| 
|-
| Win
| align=center| 3–0
| Chris Munsen
| TKO (punches)
| UFCF 2
| 
| align=center| 1
| align=center| N/A
| Washington, United States
| 
|-
| Win
| align=center| 2–0
| Bob Gilstrap
| Decision (unanimous)
| UFCF 2
| 
| align=center| 1
| align=center| 10:00
| Washington, United States
| 
|-
| Win
| align=center| 1–0
| Chris Charnos
| Submission (rear-naked choke)
| UFCF 1
| 
| align=center| 1
| align=center| 2:41
| Washington, United States
|

Submission grappling record

|- style="text-align:center; background:#f0f0f0;"
| style="border-style:none none solid solid; "|Result
| style="border-style:none none solid solid; "|Opponent
| style="border-style:none none solid solid; "|Method
| style="border-style:none none solid solid; "|Event
| style="border-style:none none solid solid; "|Date
| style="border-style:none none solid solid; "|Round
| style="border-style:none none solid solid; "|Time
| style="border-style:none none solid solid; "|Notes

|-
|Loss || Gordon Ryan || Submission (triangle choke) || Quintet || October 5, 2018 || 1 || N/A ||
|-
|Win || Ryron Gracie || Submission (toe hold) || Metamoris VI || May 9, 2015 || 1 || 12:58 || 
|-
|Win || Dean Lister || Submission (scarf-hold choke) || Metamoris IV || August 9, 2014 || 1 || 19:48 || 
|-
|Loss || Ricardo Almeida || Submission (guillotine choke) || ADCC Absolute || 2000 || N/A || N/A || 
|-
|Loss || Mark Kerr || Submission (kimura) || ADCC +99 || 2000 || N/A|| N/A || 
|-
|Loss || Garth Taylor || Points || ADCC Absolute || 1999 || 1 || 10:00 || 
|-
|Win || Pedro Duarte || Submission || ADCC Absolute || 1999 || 1 || 1:19 || 
|-
|Loss || Mark Kerr || Points || ADCC +99 kg || 1999 || 1 || 10:00 || 
|-
|Win || Travis Fulton || Points || ADCC +99 kg || 1999 || 1 || 15:00 || 
|-

Bare knuckle record

|-
|Win
|align=center| 1–0
|Marcin Różalski
|TKO (doctor stoppage)
|KSW Genesis: Różalski vs. Barnett 
| 
|align=center|2
|align=center|3:00
|Poland
|
|-

See also
 List of male mixed martial artists
 List of professional wrestlers by MMA record

References

External links

 
 

1977 births
Living people
Sportspeople from Seattle
American catch wrestlers
American atheists
American car collectors
American male professional wrestlers
American male mixed martial artists
Heavyweight mixed martial artists
Mixed martial artists utilizing catch wrestling
Mixed martial artists utilizing Muay Thai
Mixed martial artists utilizing Brazilian jiu-jitsu
American Muay Thai practitioners
American practitioners of Brazilian jiu-jitsu
People awarded a black belt in Brazilian jiu-jitsu
Mixed martial artists from Washington (state)
American submission wrestlers
American expatriate sportspeople in Japan
American male film actors
Ballard High School (Seattle, Washington) alumni
Professional wrestling trainers
Mixed martial arts trainers
Ultimate Fighting Championship male fighters
Ultimate Fighting Championship champions
American sportspeople in doping cases
Doping cases in mixed martial arts
Mixed martial arts broadcasters
Mixed martial artists from California
Professional wrestlers from California
Professional wrestlers from Washington (state)
Expatriate professional wrestlers in Japan
Professional wrestling announcers
Bellator male fighters